Martine Murray (born 1965) is an Australian author and illustrator residing in Melbourne. She has written many critically acclaimed books, including How to Make a Bird, winner of the Queensland Premier's Literary Awards Young Adult award in 2004, and The Slightly True Story of Cedar B. Hartley, winner of the Queensland Premier's Literary Awards Children's Book award in 2006.

She has studied filmmaking at Prahran College, art at the Victorian College of the Arts and Movement & Dance at Melbourne University. She has formed a dance theatre company called Bird on a Wire, and recently received Arts Victoria funding to develop and perform a full-length work, as part of Melbourne's Next Wave Festival. She also teaches yoga and has been involved in community circus.

Martine is enrolled in Professional Writing at RMIT and plans further study in screen writing and short story.

Martine is the subject of The Whitlams' 1997 song 'Melbourne'. She calls her dog 'The Bear'.

Books 
 A Dog Called Bear, Random House Australia, 2000 
 A Moose Called Mouse, Allen & Unwin, 2001 
 How to Make a Bird, Allen & Unwin, 2003 
 Mannie and the Long Brave Day, with Sally Rippin, Allen & Unwin, 2009, 
 Molly and Pim and the Millions of Stars, Text Publishing, 2015, 
 Marsh and Me, Text Publishing, 2017, 
 The Last Summer of Ada Bloom, Text Publishing, 2018

Cedar B. Hartley series
 The Slightly True Story of Cedar B. Hartley (Who Planned to Live an Unusual Life), Allen & Unwin, 2002 
 The Slightly Bruised Glory of Cedar B. Hartley (Who Can't Help Flying High and Falling in Deep), Allen & Unwin, 2005 

Henrietta series
 Henrietta: There's No One Better, Allen & Unwin, 2004 
 Henrietta the Great Go-Getter, Allen & Unwin, 2006 
 Henrietta Gets a Letter, Allen & Unwin, 2008 
 Henrietta and the Perfect Night, Allen & Unwin, 2017 
 Henrietta the Greatest Go-Getter, Allen & Unwin, 2017  (compilation)

 Awards 
The Slightly True Story of Cedar B. Hartley was shortlisted for the CBC's young readers category in 2003. How to Make a Bird'' won the Young Adult Book Award at the 2004 Queensland Premier's Literary Awards.

References

External links 

Official website
 - Interview of author
 - Profile of author
 - Review of one of her books
Review from The Guardian
Review from the Chicago Tribune
Review from the Cairns Post
Brief biographical article
Review in Home News Tribune

Australian children's writers
Living people
Writers from Melbourne
1951 births
Australian women children's writers